Please don't delete this article because this actor or actress is new and will play/is playing a lead, supporting or breakthrough role in the tokusatsu series "Kamen Rider Ex-Aid" and will continue their career and make more roles, either lead or supporting, after the end of the programme.

 is a Japanese actor. He is a member of Gekidan Exile.

Onozuka is represented with LDH.

Biography
Onozuka entered Funabashi Senior High School by a football recommendation and was active in the football club, but he was aiming for a singer and transfer to a high school with the communication system.

He participated in the Vocal Battle Audition 2 in February 2010 but also failed in the second screening. Onozuka later participated in 3rd Gekidan Exile Audition which was held from August the same year, he became a finalist but lost.

In September 2012, he joined Gekidan Exile as a result of the performance of the stage play Attack No. 1.

Filmography

Stage

TV dramas

Films

Direct-to-video

Radio dramas

Advertisements

Music videos

References

External links 

  

21st-century Japanese male actors
Actors from Chiba Prefecture
1993 births
Living people
LDH (company) artists